This is a list of films produced by the Tollywood (Telugu language film industry) based in Hyderabad in the year 1986.

Top 3 grossing movies
1.swsthimuthyam
2.rakshasudu
3.simhasanam

List of released films

References 

1986
Telugu
Telugu films